Subhavartha is a 1998 Indian Telugu-language drama film directed by P. N. Ramachandra Rao and starring Arjun and Soundarya. The film was remade in Tamil by Ramachandra Rao as Mannavaru Chinnavaru (1999) with Arjun and Soundarya reprising their roles after Arjun expressed interest in remaking the film.

Cast 
 Arjun Sarja as Rajendra Prasad (Raja)
 Soundarya as Meghana
 Kavya
 Chandra Mohan
 Siva Parvathi
 Srihari
 Kota Srinivasa Rao
 Brahmanandam
 M. S. Narayana
 Narra Venkateswara Rao
 Master Aditya Paruchuri
Master Surya Paruchuri

Soundtrack
The songs were composed by Koti. All lyrics were written by Sirivennela Sitarama Sastry.

References

External links 
 

1998 films
Indian drama films
1990s Telugu-language films
Telugu films remade in other languages
Films scored by Koti